The Association for Socialism in Gabon (APSG)  was a political party in Gabon.

History
After the restoration of multi-party democracy, the party won six seats in the 1990 parliamentary elections. It supported President Omar Bongo of the Gabonese Democratic Party in the 1993 presidential elections.

References

Defunct political parties in Gabon
Socialism in Gabon
Socialist parties in Africa